Estela V. Welldon, MD DSc (Hon) F.R.C.Psych Hon. Memb. A.Psa.A. BPC, is an honorary consultant psychiatrist in forensic psychotherapy at the Tavistock and Portman NHS Trust.

Biography
Born in Mendoza, Argentina, she studied medicine at Universidad Nacional de Cuyo. She founded (and has been elected honorary president for life) of the International Association for Forensic Psychotherapy in 1991.

She works privately as a psychoanalytical psychotherapist and organizational consultant. She is a member of the British Association of Psychotherapists, the British Psychoanalytic Council, the Institute of Group Analysis, the American Group Psychotherapy Association and the International Association of Group Psychotherapy.

Welldon is the author of numerous articles and chapters as well as a number of books: Mother Madonna Whore, the Idealization and Denigration of Motherhood (Free Association Books, 1988),  Sadomasochism (2002) and Playing with Dynamite: A Personal Approach to the Psychoanalytic Understanding of Perversions, Violence, and Criminality (2011,. Welldon was the primary editor of A Practical Guide to Forensic Psychotherapy (1997).

Awards and honours
In 1997, Welldon was awarded an Honorary Doctorate in Sciences from Oxford Brookes University in recognition of her work in developing and promoting forensic psychotherapy.

In January 2013, Welldon received an honorary membership in the American Psychoanalytic Association.

References

External links
Official Website
Welldon, E. V. (2009), Dancing with Death. British Journal of Psychotherapy, 25: 149–182. 

Year of birth missing (living people)
Living people
British psychiatrists
Argentine expatriates in the United Kingdom
People from Mendoza Province
British women medical doctors
Group psychotherapists
British women psychiatrists